West Little River is a census-designated place (CDP) in Miami-Dade County, Florida, United States. The population was 34,128 at the 2020 census.

Most of West Little River was originally a neighborhood of the city of Miami when it was annexed into the city in 1925. With the arrival of the Great Depression, Miami gave up its jurisdiction and West Little River became an unincorporated area of Miami-Dade County.

Geography
It is bordered by Westview to the north, Pinewood and El Portal to the east, Hialeah to the west, and Gladeview and the Miami neighborhood of Liberty City to the south.

The Little River Canal forms the northeast border of the CDP.

Demographics

2020 census

Note: the US Census treats Hispanic/Latino as an ethnic category. This table excludes Latinos from the racial categories and assigns them to a separate category. Hispanics/Latinos can be of any race

As of the census of 2000, there were 32,498 people, 9,519 households, and 7,386 families residing in the CDP. The racial makeup of the CDP was 32.53% White (3.4% were Non-Hispanic White,) 57.22% African American, 0.26% Native American, 0.18% Asian, 0.07% Pacific Islander, 5.49% from other races, and 4.25% from two or more races. Hispanic or Latino of any race were 40.05% of the population.

There were 9,519 households, out of which 33.5% had children under the age of 18 living with them, 41.7% were married couples living together, 27.2% had a female householder with no husband present, and 22.4% were non-families. 17.5% of all households were made up of individuals, and 6.9% had someone living alone who was 65 years of age or older.  The average household size was 3.39 and the average family size was 3.75.

In the CDP, the population was spread out, with 28.3% under the age of 18, 10.2% from 18 to 24, 27.4% from 25 to 44, 22.6% from 45 to 64, and 11.4% who were 65 years of age or older. The median age was 34 years. For every 100 females, there were 95.8 males. For every 100 females age 18 and over, there were 92.5 males.

As of 2000, speakers of English as a first language accounted for 53.61% o residents, Spanish speakers made up 41.21%, and French Creole was the mother tongue of 4.93% of the population.

As of 2000, West Little River had the thirtieth highest percentage of Cuban residents in the US, with 16.78% of the populace. It had the thirty-first highest percentage of Haitian residents in the US, at 6.0% of the population (tied with Miramar), and the ninth highest percentage of Nicaraguan residents in the US, at 3.58% of its population. It also had the fifty-eighth most Dominicans in the US, at 2.42%, while it had the fourteenth highest percentage of Hondurans, at 2.18% of all residents. West Little River's Bahamian community had the sixth highest percentage of residents, which was at 1.2% (tied with North Miami.) It is also home to the ninety-fourth highest percentage of Guatemalan residents in the US, at 1.2% of the population as well (tied with three other US areas, including Bonita Springs, Fla.)

The median income for a household in the CDP was $26,686, and the median income for a family was $29,013. Males had a median income of $22,058 versus $20,524 for females. The per capita income for the CDP was $12,026. About 24.7% of families and 29.0% of the population were below the poverty line, including 38.6% of those under age 18 and 28.8% of those age 65 or over.

Government and infrastructure
The Miami-Dade Police Department operates the Northside District Station in West Little River.

Education

Miami-Dade County Public Schools operates area public schools:

Elementary schools
Broadmoor Elementary School
Miami Park Elementary School
Dr. Henry W. Mack/West Little River Elementary School
Formerly West Little River Elementary, renamed in 2004 after the chairperson of the MDCPS audit committee.
Arcola Lake Elementary School

Middle schools
Madison Middle School

High schools
Miami Central High School
William H. Turner Technical Arts High School

Colleges and universities
Miami-Dade College- North Campus (public college)

Libraries
Miami-Dade Public Library operates area public libraries:

North Central Library

Transportation
West Little River is served by Metrobus throughout the area, the Miami Metrorail, Tri-Rail, and Amtrak:

Metrorail:
  Northside (NW 79th Street and NW 32nd Avenue)
  Dr. Martin Luther King Jr. Plaza (NW 62nd Street and NW 27th Avenue)

Tri-Rail:
  Tri-Rail/Metrorail Transfer (NW 79th Street and NW 37th Avenue)

Amtrak:
  Amtrak-Miami: Silver Star and Silver Meteor service, (NW 79th Street and NW 37th Avenue)

References

Census-designated places in Miami-Dade County, Florida
Census-designated places in Florida